The Australian Young Greens, commonly referred to as the Young Greens, is a federation of Young Greens groups from each Australian state and territory. Collectively, they form the youth wing of the Australian Greens, representing members aged 31 and under.

The group and its related state and territory divisions are a recruiting platform for the party and are often involved in activism on various youth-related issues. It is officially regarded to be a working group of the Australian Greens. It is underpinned by the four Greens pillars of ecological sustainability, social justice, grassroots democracy, and peace and non-violence.

Notable members of the group have included Senator Jordon Steele-John, one of the youngest current members of the Australian Parliament, and Johnathan Davis, a member of the ACT Legislative Assembly. The Australian Young Greens is a member of the Asia-Pacific Young Greens and the Global Young Greens.

Role and function
The Australian Young Greens, as well as each of the state and territory Young Greens branches, are an important aspect in the representation of young voices within the party.

In some states and territories, they often take the lead in organising protests and other events to highlight issues of social injustice and environmental degradation. This has included opposition to the Foetal Personhood Bill (Zoe's Law) in New South Wales in 2014 and the dredging of the Great Barrier Reef in Queensland in 2015. The Young Greens have also consistently protested against federal funding cuts to Australian universities, as well as to reduce the voting age to 16.

The group also has an active social media presence, with its Facebook page having over 113,000 likes as of May 2021, more than the federal youth wings of both the major Labor and Liberal parties.

Structure
The Young Greens typically meets annually at 'AYGCon', a national conference which sees the election of national officebearers by the coordinating group, the hosting of workshops, and discussion of the direction of the group. National officebearers that are elected are two co-convenors, a secretary, a treasurer, and a campaigns coordinator. Any of these positions may be held by two people given that one identifies as a non-cis male.

The coordinating group of the Young Greens is primarily responsible for facilitating interaction between the different state and territory branches and organising national youth campaigns. It consists of the national officebearers, as well as two delegates and the co-convenors from each state and territory branch. Each branch is governed by its own rules and constitution, with each having its own process of selecting officebearers and delegates.

The Young Greens are governed by its Terms of Reference, first ratified in 2011 and significantly updated in 2013 to adopt an organised officebearer structure for the branch.

List of national co-convenors
List of co-convenors of the Australian Young Greens:

 2013-14: James Searle (Vic.) & Sam Dixon (NSW)
 2014-15: Erin Moroney (NSW) & Eliza Scarpellino (NSW)
 2015-17: Harriet de Kok (SA) & Sophie Jamieson (Vic.)
 2017-18: Axeris Sondyre (NSW) & Robyn Lewis (Tas.)
 2018-19: Ashley Sutherland (Vic.) & Mark Clayton (Qld.)
 2019-21: Imogen Lindenberg (Qld.) & Josie Mira (Qld.)
 2021-22: Elizabeth Thompson (NSW) & Jasper Lees (Tas.)
 2022-22: Stasi Kapetanos (SA) & Eloise Mukasa (Qld.)
 2022-Present: Lucy O'Connell-Doherty (SA) & Eloise Mukasa (Qld.)

University and regional groups
The Young Greens are active in most metropolitan and some regional Australian universities. They have student union representation at a number of these universities, with members of the Australian Young Greens having held the position of president at the University of Wollongong (2013–14), the University of Technology Sydney (2014), Murdoch University (2016), Edith Cowan University (2010, 2013, 2016, 2018), Flinders University (2018), and others.

The Young Greens also operate outside of university campuses via regional local groups. This has included groups in Greater Western Sydney, the Northern Rivers region in New South Wales, and the Gold and Sunshine Coasts in Queensland.

References

Youth wings of political parties in Australia
Australian Greens
2011 establishments in Australia